Sarva-darsana-siddhanta Sangraha, or simply Sarva-Siddhānta-Saṅgrahaḥ is a work by Adi Shankaracharya written in 8th century CE, which sketches eleven major systems of thought of different Indian schools of philosophy during that period in the Indian sub-continent.

Chapters 

The eleven systems of philosophy covered in the work are listed below.

Non-Vedic schools 

These unorthodox schools fall under Nāstika, who reject Vedas as an authoritative system.

 Lokāyata (or Cārvāka)
 Arhata philosophy (or Jainism)
 Buddhism
 Mādhyamika
 Yogācāra
 Sautrāntika
 Vaibhāṣika

Vedic schools 

The Āstika systems described here consider Vedas as a reliable and authoritative source of knowledge.

 Vaiśeṣika
 Naiyāyika
 Theory of Prabhākara
 Theory of Bhaṭṭācārya
 Sāṅkhya
 System of Patañjali
 System of Veda-Vyāsa
 Vedānta

Related works 

Adi Shankaracharya is also said to have authored Sarva Vedānta Siddhānta Sāra Saṅgraha (A Summary of the Essence of the Established Conclusions from All the Upaniṣads), also known as The Quintessence of Vedanta. This work is later said to have inspired Madhavacharya (also known as Vidyaranya) to write Sarva-darsana Sangraha, a compendium of 16 schools of philosophy during the 12th century CE.

References

External links 

 Read online - Sarva Siddhanta Sangraha

Indian philosophy